The Welsh Alliance Football League (formerly the Lock Stock Welsh Alliance Football League, for sponsorship reasons) was a football league formed in 1984, and discontinued in 2020 following the reorganisation of the Welsh football pyramid for the 2020-21 season.

Division 1 was part of the third level of the Welsh football league system in North Wales.

Member clubs for the final 2019–20 season
As confirmation from the league on 25 June 2019.

Division 1

Division 2

Past Champions

References

 
Sports leagues established in 1984
1984 establishments in Wales
Wales
Wales
Sports leagues disestablished in 2020
2020 disestablishments in Wales
Defunct football competitions in Wales